Keltybridge is a village in Perth and Kinross, Scotland, about one mile north of Kelty, which is across the Fife border. It stands on the northern banks of Kelty Burn.

The sites of two coal pits and an engine house depicted on the first edition of the Ordnance Survey 6-inch map (Fife & Kinross, 1856, sheet 30), to the west of Kelty Bridge are now occupied by a modern house.

Kelty Bridge is a Category B listed structure.

References

Gallery

Villages in Perth and Kinross